Osmaneli District is a district of Bilecik Province of Turkey. Its seat is the town Osmaneli. Its area is 490 km2, and its population is 21,497 (2021).

Composition
There is one municipality in Osmaneli District:
 Osmaneli

There are 27 villages in Osmaneli District:

 Adliye
 Ağlan
 Akçapınar
 Avdan
 Balçıkhisar
 Belenalan
 Bereket
 Borcak
 Boyunkaya
 Büyükyenice
 Çerkeşli
 Ciciler
 Çiftlik
 Dereyörük
 Düzmeşe
 Ericek
 Günüören
 Hisarcık
 Kazancı
 Kızılöz
 Medetli
 Oğulpaşa
 Orhaniye
 Sarıyazı
 Selçik
 Selimiye
 Soğucakpınar

References

Districts of Bilecik Province